Vietteania is a genus of moths of the family Noctuidae described by Charles Ernest Edmond Rungs in 1955.

Species
 Vietteania affinis (Warnecke, 1929)
 Vietteania catadela D. S. Fletcher, 1961
 Vietteania griveaudi Viette, 1979
 Vietteania pinna (Saalmüller, 1891)
 Vietteania pyrostrota (Hampson, 1907)
 Vietteania torrentium (Guenée, 1852)

References

Mythimnini